The American Academy of the Fine Arts was an art institution founded in 1802 in New York City, to encourage appreciation and teaching of the classical style. It exhibited copies of classical works and encouraged artists to emulate the classical in their work. The mayor of New York city at the time, Richard Varick, and Gulian Verplanck, a New York politician, were some of the Academy's original organizers. Younger artists grew increasingly restive under its constraint, and in 1825 left to found the National Academy of Design.

History

The Academy's original name was the New York Academy of the Fine Arts. Its founders included Richard Varick, a mayor of New York City, and Gulian C. Verplanck, a future influential politician in the state and nationally.

A conservative organization, the academy was led by John Trumbull, a painter, who served as its president from 1817 to 1836. He had long practiced the classical ideal of art and became known as a tyrant in his attitude toward young painters. The Academy's conservatism and Trumbull's unyielding attitude eventually led to such a level of dissatisfaction among the younger painters that they formed a splinter group.

In 1825, they abandoned the American Academy to found the National Academy of Design, also in New York City. The American Academy said it regretted the loss of the young artists, but affirmed its traditions. Ultimately it did not attract enough students and support, and closed in 1841. The National Academy has continued as a vital institution.

The West commission
In 1818, Trumbull, representing the American Academy, commissioned a portrait of his former teacher and mentor, the painter Benjamin West, from Thomas Lawrence, widely considered to be the most accomplished English portraitist of the age. Lawrence set a price of 400 guineas for the project. According to Carrie Rebora's 20th-century account, to pay for the work, Trumbull opened a subscription fund before finally taking delivery of the painting in 1822 for the Academy. Two earlier 19th-century accounts had said that Lawrence was made a member of the Academy and painted the portrait in exchange.

See also

Pennsylvania Academy of the Fine Arts
National Academy of Design
Thomas Lawrence
Samuel Morse
John Trumbull
Richard Varick
Gulian Verplanck
Benjamin West

References

Further reading
 Cowdrey, Mary Bartlett, American Academy of Fine Arts and American Art-Union, 1816–1852, with a history of the American Academy by Theodore Sizer, New York Historical Society, 1953. Google book.
 Morse, Samuel Finley Breese, Examination of Col. Trumbull's address, in opposition to the projected union of the American Academy of Fine Arts, and the National Academy of Design / by Samuel F.B. Morse, president of the National Academy; made at the request of the Council, Includes the "Address of Col. Trumbull", p. [17]-20, American Academy of the Fine Arts/National Academy of Design New York, Clayton & Van Norden, printers, 1833.
 Papers of the American Academy of the Fine Arts : acts of incorporation, by laws, etc., minutes of meetings (1802–1817, 1817–1830, 1830–1839), secretary's book, American Academy of the Fine Arts, New York Historical Society, 1951.
 Verplanck, Gulian Crommelin, American Academy of the Fine Arts, Address delivered before the American Academy of Fine Arts, Wiley, 1824. Google book.

External links
Official website

1802 establishments in New York (state)
Art schools in New York City
Educational institutions established in 1802
Learned societies of the United States